"Homicide" is a song by American rapper Logic featuring fellow American rapper Eminem. It was released on May 3, 2019, by Visionary and Def Jam as the third single from his fifth album Confessions of a Dangerous Mind (2019). The song has both artists mocking and criticizing contemporary rappers for their mumble delivery and overreliance on AutoTune and ghostwriters. "Homicide" reached number two on the Hot R&B/Hip-Hop Songs chart, giving Logic his third top 5 hit on that chart. It also gave him his second top 10 hit on the Hot 100 chart, peaking at number five. The song also charted in countries like Australia, Finland, New Zealand and the UK. The song was certified Silver and Platinum by the British Phonographic Industry (BPI) and Recording Industry Association of America (RIAA) respectively. An accompanying music video for the song features appearances from Chauncey Leopardi and Chris D'Elia portraying stunt doubles of both artists respectively.

Background
On May 1, 2019, Logic announced the song on his social media while simultaneously unveiling the artwork and revealing its release date to be May 3. The song's artwork resembles the cover art of previous singles thus it was believed to appear on Confessions of a Dangerous Mind. This was confirmed on May 8. The song marks the first collaboration between the two rappers.

Composition 
In the song, Logic and Eminem deliver their flow and speech on a quick rate. The two rappers, especially the latter, mock contemporary rappers in their lyrics. They also criticize how modern day rappers mumble, overuse AutoTune, and how they songwrite with the help of ghostwriters.

Music video
The official music video was released on June 28, 2019. The music video features appearances from Chauncey Leopardi and Chris D'Elia, both portraying Logic and Eminem's stunt doubles respectively. The music video ends with a 45-second clip of Eminem spoofing comedian Chris D'Elia imitating him, taken from a video that D'Elia had posted on YouTube in September 2018.

Commercial performance
In the US, "Homicide" debuted at number five on the Billboard Hot 100, becoming Logic's second top ten hit, following the number three peak of "1-800-273-8255". It fell out of the top ten the next week. Elsewhere, it also debuted and peaked in the top ten in Australia, Finland and New Zealand, as well as reaching the top twenty in the UK.

Personnel
Credits adapted from Tidal.

 Bregma – production, composition
 Dillan Beau Ballard
 Donnell Stephens III
 Jeremy Alexander Uribe
 Robert Campbell – mixing, recording engineer
 Chris D'Elia – additional vocals
 Eminem – vocals, composition
 Smokey Hall – background vocals
 Logic – vocals, composition
 Shroom – co-production, composition

Charts

Weekly charts

Year-end charts

Certifications

References

2019 songs
2019 singles
Logic (rapper) songs
Eminem songs
Def Jam Recordings singles
Songs written by Logic (rapper)
Songs written by Eminem